The Haunted Pajamas is a 1917 comedy-drama film directed by Fred J. Balshofer. The film is based on the novel of the same name by Francis Perry Elliott. A copy of the film survives.

Plot
Richard Hudson receives a pair of silk pajamas from a friend that can transform a person into another person. When he puts the pajamas on, he turns into a fighter, but returns to normal the next day. Throughout the film, two more characters put on the pajamas, and they are mistaken for two other characters in the film. The film ends with the characters burning the pajamas.

Cast
Harold Lockwood as Richard Hudson
Carmel Myers as Frances Kirkland
Edward Sedgwick as Jack Billings
Lester Cuneo as Judge Billings
Paul Willis as Francis Billings
Harry de Roy as Jenkins
Helen Ware as Elizabeth Billings
William De Vaull as Colonel Kirkland

References

External links

1917 films
American silent feature films
American black-and-white films
1910s English-language films
1917 comedy-drama films
Films directed by Fred J. Balshofer
1910s American films
Silent American comedy-drama films